North Bank Baptist Christian Association is a Baptist Christian denomination in India. It is headquartered in Shakomato Christian Center, Biswanath Chariali, Sonitpur District of Assam.

History
It was established in the year 1950. As of 2015, It has 1,136 congregations and 88,976 members. It is affiliated to the Baptist World Alliance.

The following Baptist associations are its constituent bodies:

 Boro Baptist Convention
 Nyishi Baptist Church Council
 Adi Baptist Union
 Sonitpur Baptist Christian Association
 Lakhimpur Baptist Christian Association
 Apatani Baptist Association
 Dhemaji Mishing Baptist Association
 Dhemaji Baptist Christian Association

See also 

 Council of Baptist Churches in Northeast India
 List of Christian denominations in North East India

References

External links
bwanet.org/about-us2/stats

1950 establishments in India
Baptist denominations in India